Dalton McCarthy  (October 10, 1836 – May 11, 1898), or D'Alton McCarthy, was a Canadian lawyer and parliamentarian. He was the leader of the "Orange" or Protestant Irish, and fiercely fought against Irish Catholics as well as the French Catholics. He especially crusaded for the abolition of the French language in Manitoba and Ontario schools.

McCarthy was first elected to the House of Commons of Canada in the 1878 federal election as a Conservative. An Irish-born Protestant, McCarthy was stridently anti-Catholic and anti-French Canadian. He broke with the Conservatives in the 1890s, running and being re-elected as an Independent Member of Parliament (MP) in the 1891 election. He appears to have been associated with the Equal Rights Party which ran in that election but did not run as their candidate.

It was his firm, Boulton & McCarthy in Barrie, that was the first incarnation of what is now Canada's largest law firm, McCarthy Tétrault.  He appeared in the Supreme Court of Canada in the significant constitutional case of Citizens Insurance Co of Canada v Parsons, arguing successfully on behalf of two individuals claiming compensation under fire insurance policies.  The case helped establish the scope of provincial jurisdiction in contract matters. He also defended Emily Stowe in the 1879 abortion trial of Emily Stowe.

McCarthy was a founder of the "Imperial Federation League", which proposed uniting the United Kingdom and the emerging dominions under a central Cabinet government responsible to an Imperial Parliament elected from throughout the Empire. McCarthy ran his own slate of McCarthyite candidates in the 1896 election, but was the only one elected.

Following the 1896 election, McCarthy forged an alliance with Wilfrid Laurier's Liberal Party. He would likely have been appointed to cabinet in 1898 had he not died following a carriage accident.

McCarthy was a key figure in the Manitoba Schools Question, and a major proponent in pushing English only in legislatures, courts, and schools of Western Canada.

Archives 
There is a Dalton McCarthy fonds at Library and Archives Canada. Archival reference number is R4370.

Notes

References 
 
 

1836 births
1898 deaths
Lawyers in Ontario
Conservative Party of Canada (1867–1942) MPs
Independent MPs in the Canadian House of Commons
Irish emigrants to pre-Confederation Ontario
Members of the House of Commons of Canada from Manitoba
Members of the House of Commons of Canada from Ontario
People from Blackrock, Dublin
Politicians from Simcoe County
Pre-Confederation Ontario people
Accidental deaths in Ontario
Canadian Protestants